Jeon So-yeon, better known mononymously as Soyeon, is a South Korean rapper, singer, songwriter, producer, and leader of the girl group (G)I-dle, signed to Cube Entertainment. She is credited in the lyrics, music production and arrangement for most of (G)I-dle's songs, and has written and produced songs for other artists as well. All song credits are adapted from the Korea Music Copyright Association's (KOMCA) database, unless otherwise noted. In June 2021, Soyeon was listed on KOMCA top 100 as the first fourth-generation girl group and third overall behind fourth-generation idol . She is also the youngest among female K-pop idols that are the most independent in the K-pop industry.

Solo works

(G)I-dle albums/singles

(G)I-dle's other works

Other artists

Other works

References

Jeon So-yeon
J
J